Baunshagadia is a village in Nayagarh district, Odisha, India. It is 16 km from the district headquarters,  Nayagarh.

References

Villages in Nayagarh district